Egnasia fasciata is a species of moth of the family Noctuidae first described by Frederic Moore in 1882. It is known from India.

References

Calpinae
Moths of Asia